Ayaulym Kassymova (born 12 May 1994) is a Kazakhstani freestyle wrestler. She won the silver medal in the women's 63 kg event at the 2017 Asian Indoor and Martial Arts Games held in Ashgabat, Turkmenistan.

Career 

In 2018, she competed in the women's freestyle 62 kg event at the Asian Games in Jakarta, Indonesia without winning a medal. She was eliminated in her second match by Sakshi Malik of India.

In 2020, she won the silver medal in the 62 kg event at the Asian Wrestling Championships held in New Delhi, India. In the final, she lost against Yukako Kawai of Japan.

In April 2021, she competed at the Asian Olympic Qualification Tournament hoping to qualify for the 2020 Summer Olympics in Tokyo, Japan. In October 2021, she competed in the 62 kg event at the World Wrestling Championships held in Oslo, Norway.

In 2022, she competed at the Yasar Dogu Tournament held in Istanbul, Turkey. She competed in the 62 kg event at the 2022 World Wrestling Championships held in Belgrade, Serbia.

Achievements

References

External links 
 

Living people
1994 births
Place of birth missing (living people)
Kazakhstani female sport wrestlers
Wrestlers at the 2018 Asian Games
Asian Games competitors for Kazakhstan
Asian Wrestling Championships medalists
21st-century Kazakhstani women